Monte Semprevisa is the highest peak in the Monti Lepini, in southern Lazio, central Italy.

It is located across the boundary of the provinces of Rome and Latina, in the territories of Carpineto Romano and Bassiano. Like most of the Lepini peaks, it is composed of limestone rocks.

External links 
 Peakbagger.com: Monte Petrella, Italy (Retrieved on October 14, 2008.)

Semprevisa